Lobocla is a genus of skippers in the family Hesperiidae subfamily Eudaminae, within which they are placed in subtribe Loboclina. Unlike the rest of the Eudaminae, which have a New World distribution, the genus is endemic to Asia.

Species
Li et al. 2019 gives the following species and subspecies for this genus:

Lobocla aborica (Tytler, 1915) – India
Lobocla aborica aborica (Tytler, 1915)
Lobocla aborica zesta Evans, 1949
Lobocla aborica tonka Evans, 1949
Lobocla bifasciatus (Bremer & Grey, 1853) – Indochina, China, Korea, Ussuri.
Lobocla contractus (Leech, 1894) – China
Lobocla disparalis Murayama, 1995
Lobocla germanus (Oberthür, 1886) – China
Lobocla liliana (Atkinson, 1871) – type species
Lobocla liliana ignatius (Plötz, 1882)
Lobocla liliana liliana (Atkinson, 1871)
Lobocla nepos (Oberthür, 1886) – western China
Lobocla nepos nepos (Oberthür, 1886)
Lobocla nepos phyllis (Hemming, 1933)
Lobocla proximus (Leech, 1891) – western China, Tibet
Lobocla quadripunctata Fan & Wang, 2004
Lobocla simplex (Leech, 1891) – western China

Distribution

Notes and references

Natural History Museum Lepidoptera genus database

External links
 images  representing  Lobocla  at  Consortium for the Barcode of Life
Russian Insects

Eudaminae
Hesperiidae genera
Taxa named by Frederic Moore